Artem Butskyy (born August 24, 1981) is a Ukrainian professional basketball player for Budivelnyk Kyiv of the UA SuperLeague.

June 28, 2005 signed a three-year contract with BC Kyiv.

External links
 FIBA Europe
 Artem Butskyy at basketball.eurobasket.com

References 

BC Budivelnyk players
Ukrainian men's basketball players
1981 births
Living people
BC Kyiv players
BC Sumyhimprom players
BC Cherkaski Mavpy players
BC Zaporizhya players
BC Odesa players
MBC Mykolaiv players
Sportspeople from Poltava
Point guards